Cedar Lake is a lake located in St. Croix County and Polk County, Wisconsin, 3.5 miles east of Star Prairie. Cedar Lake is best known for its Muskellunge (Muskie) fishing. Fish commonly found in this lake include Northern Pike, Large Mouth Bass, Panfish, and small mouth bass. The Wisconsin Department of Natural Resources stocks cedar lake with walleye and muskie.

References

Lakes of St. Croix County, Wisconsin